Ewert Bengtsson of Uppsala University, Sweden is a biomedical engineer who was named a Fellow of the Institute of Electrical and Electronics Engineers (IEEE) in 2015 for his contributions to quantitative microscopy and biomedical image analysis.

References 

Fellow Members of the IEEE
Living people
Academic staff of Uppsala University
21st-century American engineers
Year of birth missing (living people)